Haynt (הײַנט - "Today"; Yidishes tageblat 1906-08) was a Yiddish daily newspaper, published in Warsaw from 1906 until 1939. 
 
Newspaper Yidishes tageblat (יידישעס טאגעבלאט) was founded in 1906 by Zionist Samuel Jackan, a former contributor to the Hebrew language paper Ha-Tsefirah.

In 1908 Yidishes tageblat changed its name to Haynt and quickly established itself as the premier Yiddish newspaper in the Congress Poland.

The practice of reprinting Yiddish fiction in serialized form helped Haynt set new circulation records for Yiddish journalism. By 1913 the newspaper reached a circulation of more than 150,000 copies.

From 1908 till 1932 Haynt was a private company. In 1932 a cooperative called Alt-Nay was formed by the staff, who administered the newspaper ever since.

Contributors
 Esriel Carlebach (עזריאל קארלעבאך), also under pseudonym Levi Gotthelf (לוי גאָטהעלף).
Boris Smolar
 Moshe Sneh
Sholem Aleichem, in particular, the second series of the exploits of Menahem-Mendl

References

External links
 Today: A Jewish Newspaper, 1908-1939 by Chaim Finkelstein
 Complete digitized run of Haynt, 1908-1939 at the Historical Jewish Press

Yiddish newspapers
Newspapers published in the Russian Empire
Defunct newspapers published in Poland
Yiddish-language mass media in Poland
Newspapers published in Warsaw
Daily newspapers published in Poland
Zionism in Poland
Jews and Judaism in Warsaw